Boulder is an unincorporated community in Clinton County, Illinois, United States. Boulder is located on the eastern shore of Carlyle Lake; a railroad line crosses the lake from Boulder to Keyesport.

References

Unincorporated communities in Clinton County, Illinois
Unincorporated communities in Illinois